The 2022 MTV Europe Music Awards were held on 13 November 2022 at the PSD Bank Dome in Düsseldorf, Germany. This marks the sixth time the award show is hosted in Germany. The show aired live on MTV with an hour long pre-show leading up to the main show. British singer Rita Ora and New Zealand filmmaker Taika Waititi hosted the ceremony, marking the second time Ora was a host, the first being in 2017.

Taylor Swift won the most awards during the ceremony, winning four. Harry Styles led the nominations with seven, making him the most nominated artist, followed by Swift with six, making her the most nominated female artist.

Performances

Presenters
 Becca Dudley and Jack Saunders – pre-show hosts
 Rita Ora and Taika Waititi – main show hosts; announced the winner of Best Pop and Best Song
 Julian Lennon – presented Best Longform Video
 Leomie Anderson and Leonie Hanne – presented Best Rock
 Pos – presented Best New
 Lauren Spencer-Smith and Sam Ryder – presented Best Collaboration
 David Hasselhoff – presented Best Artist
 Luis Gerardo Méndez and Miguel Ángel Silvestre – presented Best Latin

Winners and nominations
Nominations were announced on 12 October 2022. Two new categories were introduced: Best Longform Video and Best Metaverse Performance. The awards for Best R&B and Best Live were reintroduced for this show. 

Winners are listed first and are bolded.

Regional awards

References 

MTV
2022
2022 in Germany
History of Düsseldorf
Music in Düsseldorf